Anastasiya Anatolievna Barannikova ( Gladysheva; born 27 November 1987) is a Russian ski jumper. She has competed at World Cup level since the 2011/12 season, with her best individual results being ninth place in Lillehammer on 6 December 2013, and in Nizhy Tagil on 12 December 2015; her best team finish is third in Zaō on 20 January 2018.

References

1987 births
Living people
Sportspeople from Perm, Russia
Russian female ski jumpers
Universiade medalists in ski jumping
Ski jumpers at the 2018 Winter Olympics
Olympic ski jumpers of Russia
Universiade gold medalists for Russia
Universiade silver medalists for Russia
Competitors at the 2015 Winter Universiade